Billie Nelson (2 November 1941 – 8 September 1974) was a British professional Grand Prix motorcycle road racer.

His best season was in 1969 when he finished the year in fourth place in the 500cc world championship. Nelson also passengered for Charlie Freeman on his Norton Manx sidecar racer in British and International races for a number of seasons in the 1960s. He was killed at the Opatija Circuit during the 1974 250cc Yugoslavian Grand Prix when he crashed into the crowd, injuring several spectators. He died later that night at a hospital.

References 

1941 births
1974 deaths
British motorcycle racers
250cc World Championship riders
350cc World Championship riders
500cc World Championship riders
Isle of Man TT riders
Motorcycle racers who died while racing
Sport deaths in Yugoslavia
Place of birth missing